The Japanese noun  is a word of Buddhist origin and uncertain etymology. It has several meanings, all but a few directly linked to Buddhism. It can refer to:

A person who has achieved satori (state of enlightenment) and has therefore become a "buddha". (In Buddhism, the term "buddha" in the lower case refers to a person who has become enlightened (i.e., awakened to the truth).) 
The historical Gautama Buddha himself 
The statue or the name of a buddha 
The laws of Buddhism
Figuratively, the performing of a Buddhist memorial service. The Eiga Monogatari for example contains a sentence in which the term is used in that sense.
In common parlance, a dead person; someone's soul
Figuratively, a benevolent person or someone dear to one's heart
Hotoke can also be a person's name or a nickname. It is for example a female character in the Heike Monogatari and daimyō Kōriki Kiyonaga's nickname.

Notes

References

Buddhist philosophical concepts
Buddhism in Japan

ja:仏